Robert Lucy (20 February 1923 – 23 December 2009) was a Swiss gymnast. He took part in the 1948 Olympics, where he was part of the Swiss team that won silver in the team competition. He won no individual medals, but finished 14th on the mat, and 16th on the pommel horse for his best positions. Overall, he finished 15th.

External links
Profile at Sports Reference LLC
Profile at DatabaseOlympics
Robert Lucy's obituary (page 26) 

1923 births
2009 deaths
Swiss male artistic gymnasts
Gymnasts at the 1948 Summer Olympics
Olympic gymnasts of Switzerland
Olympic silver medalists for Switzerland
Olympic medalists in gymnastics
Medalists at the 1948 Summer Olympics